Thomas Bartlet may refer to:

 Thomas Bartlet (Dedham Covenant) (17th century), signer of the Dedham Covenant
 Thomas Bartlet (master founder) (17th century), master founder of a bell foundry

See also

 Thomas Bartlett (disambiguation)